Savur District is a district of Mardin Province in Turkey which has the town of Savur as its seat. The district had a population of 25,496 in 2021.

Creation 
According to the 2012 Metropolitan Municipalities Law (Law No. 6360), all Turkish provinces with a population more than 750,000 will become metropolitan municipalities and the districts within the metropolitan municipalities  will be second-level municipalities. The law also created new districts within the provinces in addition to current districts.

Settlements 
The district encompasses forty-one neighborhoods of which three form the city of Savur.

Center neighborhoods 

 Kaplan
 Safa
 Seydin

Rural neighborhoods 

 Akyürek
 Armutalan
 Bağyaka
 Başağaç
 Başkavak
 Bengisu
 Çınarönü
 Dereiçi
 Durusu
 Evkuran
 Gölbaşı
 Harmantepe
 Hisarkaya
 İçören
 İşgören
 Karaköy
 Kayacıklar
 Kayatepe
 Kırbalı
 Kırkdirek
 Kocahüyük
 Koşuyolu
 Köprülü
 Ormancık
 Pınardere
 Sancaklı
 Serenli
 Soylu
 Sürgücü
 Şenocak
 Taşlık
 Tokluca
 Üçerli
 Üçkavak
 Yaylayanı
 Yazır
 Yenilmez
 Yeşilalan

References 

Districts of Mardin Province